The Delhi Capitals are an Indian women's cricket team that compete in the Women's Premier League (WPL), based in New Delhi. The team is owned by GMR Group and JSW Group, who also owns the men's team. The team is coached by Jonathan Batty and captained by Meg Lanning. Their squad was assembled at the inaugural WPL player auction in February 2023.

History
In October 2022, the BCCI announced its intentions to hold a five-team women's franchise cricket tournament in March 2023. The tournament was named the Women's Premier League in January 2023, with investors buying the rights to franchises through a closed bidding process during the same month. GMR Group and JSW Group, the owners of Delhi Capitals in the Indian Premier League, bought the rights to one of the franchises.

In February 2023, Jonathan Batty was announced as head coach of the side. The inaugural player auction for the WPL was held on 13 February 2023, with Delhi Capitals signing 18 players for their squad.

Current squad
As per 2023 season. Players in bold have international caps.

Support Staff

Source: Official website

See also
 Sport in Delhi

References

Delhi Capitals
Cricket clubs established in 2023
Women's Premier League (cricket) teams
JSW Group
GMR Group